Kenneth Campbell (March 26, 1881 – March 28, 1951) was a Canadian Liberal politician. He served in the Legislative Assembly of British Columbia from 1922 to 1924 for the electoral district of Nelson, resigning after being elected in 1924 to allow his leader to sit in the Assembly. He was a businessman and manager of the Kootenay Granite and Monumental Company.

References

British Columbia Liberal Party MLAs
1881 births
1951 deaths